Reddin is both a surname and a given name. Notable people with the name include:

Keith Reddin (born 1956), American actor and playwright
Thomas Reddin (1916–2004), former Los Angeles police chief
Tony Reddin (1919–2015), Irish sportsman
William James Reddin (1930–1999), British management behavioralist and writer
Ger Reddin (born 1988), Irish sportsperson. He plays hurling with his local club Castletown and has been a member of the Laois senior inter-county team since 2011
Sally Reddin, paralympic athlete from Great Britain competing mainly in category F54 shot put events
Amanda Reddin (born 1965), née Harrison, later Kirby, is a gymnastics coach, and former Olympic gymnast, for Great Britain
Reddin Andrews (1848–1923), President of Baylor University from 1885 to 1886

See also
Redden (disambiguation)
Redding (disambiguation)
Reding (disambiguation)
Redington (disambiguation)
Reading (disambiguation)
Redding (surname)
Reddington (disambiguation)